Bear Mountain is a mountain summit along the crest of the Diablo Range in Santa Clara County, California.

References

Bear Mountain (Santa Clara County, California)
Mountains of Santa Clara County, California